Szafran is a Polish surname. Notable people with the surname include:

 Helena Szafran (1888–1969), Polish botanist
 Sam Szafran (1934–2019), French artist
 Gene Szafran (1941–2011), American artist

See also
 Shafran

Polish-language surnames